The Antelope Valley Union High School District (A.V.U.H.S.D.) is located in the Antelope Valley area of California, in northern Los Angeles County.

The union high school district includes eight public high schools, one trade school, and two continuation high schools in the cities of Palmdale and Lancaster and their immediate suburbs. The district also recently opened three middle schools (grades 7-8). Two are in Palmdale & one is in Quartz Hill. The district also provides online instruction via their Virtual Academy for grades 7-12. The office of Virtual Academy is in Quartz Hill. The main district office is located in Lancaster. The Superintendent of the A.V.U.H.S.D. is Greg Nehen.

The A.V.U.H.S.D. cares for all high school level education in the metropolitan area. The elementary and junior high education is cared for by the Palmdale School District, Lancaster School District, Westside Union School District, Keppel Union School District, Wilsona School District, or Eastside Union School District depending on where the student lives.

List of schools

Comprehensive High School in Littlerock
Littlerock High School

Comprehensive High Schools in Palmdale
Highland High School
Palmdale High School
Knight High School

Comprehensive High Schools in Lancaster
Antelope Valley High School
Eastside High School
Lancaster High School
Quartz Hill High School

Early college school
SOAR High School

Trade School
Antelope Valley Regional Occupational Program (AV ROP) in Palmdale

Continuation Schools
R. Rex Parris Continuation High School in Palmdale
Desert Winds Continuation High School in Lancaster
Phoenix Continuation High School in Lancaster

Online School 
+Virtual Academy grades 7-12 office is in Quartz Hill

Academy Prep Junior Highs  
+Soar Prep Academy in Quartz Hill
+Palmdale Prep in Palmdale
+Knight Prep in Palmdale

See also
List of school districts in California
Palmdale School District
Lancaster School District (California)
Westside Union School District
Keppel Union School District
Eastside Union School District

External links
A.V.U.H.S.D. web site
Antelope Valley ROP website

Education in Palmdale, California
Education in Lancaster, California
School districts in Los Angeles County, California
Union High School District